Saadhana is an Indian Telugu language soap opera premiered on 24 January 2022 airing on GeminiTV and it is available for worldwide streaming on Sun NXT. The serial stars Shambhavi Gurumoorthy and Hussain Ahmed Khan in lead roles. The show is an official remake of Tamil television series Kayal which is being aired on Sun TV.

Plot
Saadhana is a hardworking woman and the only earner in her family. She had many hurdles in her life, like her younger sister's wedding, an uncle determined for her downfall, and workplace harassment. The story revolves around how she bravely fights against these problems.

Cast
Shambhavi Gurumoorthy as Saadhana
Hussain Ahmed Khan as Viraj aka Kamal
Seetha as Meenakshi (Saadhana, Moorthy and Jyothi's  mother)
Haanvika srinivas as Jyothi, Saadhana's younger sister and Vamsi's wife
Chandu (1-269) /Shanmukha Vickrama (269-present) as Moorthy, Saadhana's elder brother
Aparna Praveen as Dhanam, Moorthy's wife
Rafikshaa as Ravi, Saadhana's younger brother
Fouziee / Priya sreenivas as Deepa, Saadhana's younger sister
Kota Shankar Rao as Gangaraju, Sadhana's elder father
Sobha Rani as Nagamani, Gangaraju wife
Shanthi Reddy as Vedavalli, Vamsi mother
Madhu Menon as Vamsi's father
Kumrani Sridevi as Indumathi, Viraj's mother
Ajay as Chandu, Viraj's father
Jayalalitha as Rajya Lakshmi
Basavaraj as Anand, Viraj's friend
Gopikar as Doctor Gowtham 
Mamta Narayan as Aasha, Gangaraju's daughter and Saadhana's cousin
Nishanth as Siva, Gangaraju's son and Saadhana's cousin
Ramesh as Lambu

Crossover Episodes
From 6 March 2023 to 11 March 2023 in episodes 342 to 347, Saadhana had a crossover with Sundari serial as Mahasangamam.

Adaptations

References

Indian television soap operas
Telugu-language television shows
2022 Indian television series debuts
Gemini TV original programming
Telugu-language television series based on Tamil-language television series